is a park in Jōnan-ku, Fukuoka, Japan. It was originally built in the mid-Edo period (1754) for Kuroda Tsugutaka, the 6th domain head of the Kuroda clan. It was named Yūsentei after a later lord's tanka poetry. 

The park has a garden and a pond, and is open to the public.

External links
  
 Yokanavi.com 

Geography of Fukuoka
Gardens in Fukuoka Prefecture
Gardens in Japan